Xei Lei (谢雷, born August 22, 1992) is a  Lightweight Chinese Sanda kickboxer who has fought in Wu Lin Feng, K-1, C1-K, Hero Legends, Glory Kickboxing and WCK Muaythai.

Career 

March 9, 2013 in Malaysia Wu Lin Feng - Malaysia, Final, Xie Lei defeated Tie Yinghua to win the C1-K World Championship and WLF 4-man Asian tournament by decision.

February 3, 2013 in Xichang, China WCK Muaythai C3 King of Fighting Tournament Final, Xie Lei defeated Liu Xiangming to win the WCK Muaythai Lightweight International Title -60 kg by decision.

Championships and awards 

Kickboxing
C1-K
2013 C1-K World Championship
Wu Lin Feng
2013 WLF 4-man Asian tournament Winner

Muay Thai
WCK Muaythai
2013 WCK Muaythai Lightweight International Champion -60 kg

Sanda
Amateur Sanda
2008 Liaoning Provincial Sanda Championship -70 kg
2009 Liaoning Provincial Sanda Championship -70 kg
2010 Liaoning Provincial Sanda Championship -70 kg
2011 National Sports College Wushu Sanda Championship -70 kg

Kickboxing record

|-  style="background:#cfc;"
| 2019-11-30 || Win ||align=left| Yuya Yamato|| Wu Lin Feng 2019: WLF -67kg World Cup 2019-2020 6th Group Stage || Bangkok, Thailand || Decision (Unanimous)|| 3 || 3:00
|-  style="background:#cfc;"
| 2019-10-26 || Win ||align=left| Lu Jianbo|| Wu Lin Feng 2019: WLF -67kg World Cup 2019-2020 5th Group Stage || Bangkok, Thailand || Decision (Unanimous)|| 3 || 3:00
|-  style="background:#cfc;"
| 2019-09-06 || Win ||align=left| Mahdi Lali|| Wu Lin Feng 2019: WLF at Lumpinee - China vs Thailand || Bangkok, Thailand || Decision || 3 || 3:00
|-  style="background:#fbb;"
| 2019-06-29 || Loss ||align=left| Petchtanong Banchamek || Wu Lin Feng 2019: WLF -67kg World Cup 2019-2020 1st Group Stage || Zhengzhou, China || Decision || 3 || 3:00
|-  style="background:#cfc;"
| 2019-05-25 || Win ||align=left| Warwick Fulke|| Wu Lin Feng 2019: WLF China vs Canada || Zhengzhou, China || Decision || 3 || 3:00
|-  style="background:#fbb;"
| 2018-11-03 || Loss ||align=left| Petchtanong Banchamek || Wu Lin Feng 2018: WLF -67kg World Cup 2018-2019 5th Round || China || Decision (Unanimous) || 3 || 3:00
|-  style="background:#cfc;"
| 2018-09-01 || Win ||align=left| Zhang Chunyu || Wu Lin Feng 2018: WLF -67kg World Cup 2018-2019 3rd Round || Zhengzhou, China || Decision || 3 || 3:00
|-  style="background:#fbb;"
| 2018-07-07 || Loss ||align=left| Lu Jun || Wu Lin Feng 2018: WLF -67kg World Cup 2018-2019 1st Round || Zhengzhou, China || Decision || 3 || 3:00
|-  style="background:#fbb;"
| 2018-06-02|| Loss ||align=left| David Mejia (kickboxer) || Wu Lin Feng 2018: Yi Long VS Saiyok || Chongqing, China || Ext.R Decision|| 4 || 3:00
|- style="background:#fbb;"
| 2018-03-03|| Loss ||align=left| Ilias Bulaid || Wu Lin Feng 2018: World Championship Tianjin -67 kg Contender Tournament Semi Final || Tianjin, China || Decision (Unanimous) || 3 || 3:00
|- style="background:#fbb;"
| 2018-02-03 || Loss ||align=left| Singdam Kiatmuu9|| Wu Lin Feng 2018: World Championship in Shenzhen  || Shenzhen, China || Extra Round Decision (Unanimous)  || 4 || 3:00
|- style="background:#cfc;"
| 2017-12-02 || Win|| align=left| Maurice Pompey || Wu Lin Feng 2017: China VS Canada|| Zhengzhou, China || Decision (Unanimous) || 3 || 3:00
|- style="background:#fbb;"
| 2017-10-14 || Loss ||align=left| Petpanomrung Kiatmuu9 || Glory 46: China || Guangzhou, China || Decision (Unanimous) || 3 || 3:00
|- style="background:#fbb;"
| 2017-07-01 || Loss|| align=left| Erik Garcia || Wu Lin Feng 2017: China VS Spain|| Zhengzhou, China || Decision (Unanimous) || 3 || 3:00
|- style="background:#cfc;"
| 2017-06-03 || Win || align=left| Puangpornkao Por.Burapha || Wu Lin Feng 2017: China VS Japan|| Changsha, China ||  ||  ||
|- style="background:#cfc;"
| 2017-05-06 || Win || align=left| Lennart Blijd || Wu Lin Feng 2017: -63kg World Tournament|| Zhengzhou, China ||  ||  ||
|- style="background:#cfc;"
| 2017-04-15 || Win || align=left| Kongnakonban Sor.KitRungRoj	 || Wu Lin Feng 2017: Thailand VS China|| Bangkok, Thailand ||  ||  ||
|-  style="background:#cfc;"
| 2017-03-04 || Win ||align=left| Iquezang Kor.Rungthanakeat || Wu Lin Feng 2017: Kung Fu VS Muay Tha || Zhengzhou, China || Decision || 3 || 3:00
|-  style="background:#cfc;"
| 2017-01-14 || Win ||align=left| Yuta Kubo|| 2016 World Kickboxing Championship || Zhengzhou, China || Decision (unanimous) || 3 || 3:00
|- style="background:#fbb;"
| 2016-12-03 || Loss || align=left| Ilias Bulaid || Wu Lin Feng 2016: WLF x Krush - China vs Japan|| Zhengzhou, China || Decision (Unanimous) || 3 || 3:00
|- style="background:#cfc;"
| 2016-11-11|| Win ||align=left| Artur || Liaoyang International Fighting Series || China ||  ||  ||
|- style="background:#cfc;"
| 2016-10-14|| Win ||align=left| William Wayne || Wu Lin Feng 2016: WLF x KF1 || Hong Kong ||  ||  ||
|- style="background:#;"
| 2016-08-27|| ||align=left| Nathan Robson || Wu Lin Feng 2016: China vs Australia || Sydney, Australia ||  ||  ||
|- style="background:#cfc;"
| 2016-08-04|| Win||align=left| Walid Hamid || Wu Lin Feng 2016: WFL x Fight League - China vs Morocco || Tangier, Morocco || KO ||  ||
|- style="background:#cfc;"
| 2016-07-15|| Win ||align=left| Frans Sanchez || Wu Lin Feng 2016: China vs New Zealand || China ||  ||  ||
|- style="background:#cfc;"
| 2016-06-17|| Win||align=left| Denis Wosik || Wu Lin Feng: China vs Germany || Zhengzhou, China || Decision (Split) || 3 ||3:00
|- style="background:#cfc;"
| 2016-06-04|| Win||align=left| Takehiko Saito|| Wu Lin Feng vs Krush || China || Decision  || 3 ||3:00
|- style="background:#fbb;"
| 2016-04-10|| Loss ||align=left| Dyonisis Gkikas || WLF x GODS OF WAR 8 - Greece VS China || Athens, Greece || Decision (Split) || 3 ||3:00
|- style="background:#cfc;"
| 2016-03-05|| Win||align=left| Hamza Imane|| Wu Lin Feng  || Zhengzhou, China || Decision  || 3 ||3:00
|-  style="background:#fbb;"
| 2016-01-23 || Loss ||align=left| Andrei Kulebin || Wu Lin Feng Kickboxing Championship in Shanghai 8 Man Tournament, Semi Finals || Shanghai, China || Decision (unanimous) || 3 || 3:00
|-  style="background:#cfc;"
| 2016-01-23 || Win||align=left| UMA || Wu Lin Feng Kickboxing Championship in Shanghai 8 Man Tournament, Quarter Finals || Shanghai, China || Decision (unanimous) || 3 || 3:00
|-  style="background:#cfc;"
| 2015-12-05 || Win ||align=left| Nouredinne Kasrioui || Wu Lin Feng || Zhengzhou, China || Decision || 3 || 3:00
|-  style="background:#fbb;"
| 2015-08-22 || Loss ||align=left| Jomthong Chuwattana || Wu Lin Feng || Xiamen, China || Decision || 3 || 3:00
|-  style="background:#cfc;"
| 2015-08-08 || Win||align=left| Ah K  || Zenhua Hero || Chongqing, China || Decision || 3 || 3:00
|-  style="background:#cfc;"
| 2015-06-28 || Win||align=left| Alan   || Silk Road Hero || Urumqi, China || ||  ||
|-  style="background:#cfc;"
| 2015-05-02 || Win||align=left| Hussein Al Mansouri || Wu Lin Feng || Xinyang, China || Decision (Split) || 3 || 3:00
|-  style="background:#fbb;"
| 2015-05-02 || Loss ||align=left| Xu Jifu || Wu Lin Feng Xinyang Station || Xinyang, China || Decision (Unanimous) || 3 || 3:00
|-  style="background:#cfc;"
| 2015-01-03 || Win||align=left| Munell || Jiangsu Nanjing V8 ||  China ||  ||  ||
|-  style="background:#cfc;"
| 2014-12-05 || Win ||align=left| Mahasan Poptheeratham || King's Cup || Thailand || Decision  || 3 || 3:00
|-  style="background:#cfc;"
| 2014-10-11 || Win ||align=left| Koji Yoshimoto || 2013-2014 K-1 Word Max Finals || Pattaya, Thailand || Decision (Unanimous) || 3 || 3:00
|-  style="background:#fbb;"
| 2014-05-10 || Loss ||align=left| Kevin Burmester || Day of Destruction 8 || Hamburg, Germany || Decision || 3 || 3:00
|-  style="background:#cfc;"
| 2013-12-28 || Win||align=left| Pasol|| K1 World Max Quarter Final || Foshan, China || Decision || 3 || 3:00
|-  style="background:#cfc;"
| 2013-09-18 || Win||align=left| || Wu Lin Feng || Linquan County, China || ||  ||
|-  style="background:#cfc;"
| 2013-08-24 || Win||align=left| || Wu Lin Feng || Huabei, China || ||  ||
|-  style="background:#fbb;"
| 2013-08-16 || Loss||align=left| Chuchai|| Wu Lin Feng || Hami, China || Decision || 3 || 3:00
|-  style="background:#cfc;"
| 2013-06-06 || Win||align=left| Jon|| Wu Lin Feng || Dubai, United Arab Emirates || Decision || 3 || 3:00
|-  style="background:#cfc;"
| 2013-03-15 || Win||align=left| Samo Petje || K-1 WORLD GP 2012 Final Super Battle || Croatia || Decision || 3 || 3:00
|-  style="background:#cfc;"
| 2013-03-09 || Win||align=left| Tie Yinghua || Wu Lin Feng - Malaysia C1-K World Championship Final || Malaysia || Decision || 3 || 3:00 
|-	
! style=background:white colspan=9 |Wins the C1-K World Championship and WLF 4-man Asian tournament.
|-  style="background:#cfc;"
| 2013-03-09 || Win||align=left| Steve Ham || Wu Lin Feng - Malaysia C1-K World Championship Semi Finals || Malaysia || Decision || 3 || 3:00
|-  style="background:#cfc;"
| 2013-02-03|| Win ||align=left| Liu Xiangming || WCK Muaythai C3 King of Fighting Tournament Final || Xichang, China || Decision || 3 || 3:00
|-
! style=background:white colspan=9 |Wins the WCK Muaythai Lightweight International Title -60 kg.
|-  style="background:#cfc;"
| 2012-12-01 || Win ||align=left| Dekbungjong Fairtex || The Legend of Heroes-Heroes First Challenge Opening Match || Beijing, China || KO (Punch) || 1 || 2:50
|-  style="background:#fbb;"
| 2012-11-11 || Loss ||align=left| Raul Rodriguez || Wu Lin Feng-Battle of Las Vegas IV || Las Vegas || Decision (Unanimous) || 3 || 3:00
|-  style="background:#cfc;"
| 2012-09-25 || Win ||align=left| Phayas |||| Hefei, China ||  ||  ||
|-  style="background:#cfc;"
| 2012-08-24 || Win ||align=left| Brandon Watty || Wu Lin Feng: China vs New Zealand || Auckland, New Zealand || ||  ||
|-  style="background:#cfc;"
| 2012-08-08 || Win ||align=left| Akio Kashima || Tang Du Lun Sword || Bozhou, China ||  ||  ||
|-  style="background:#cfc;"
| 2012-06-22 || Win ||align=left| Zhao Kun || Wu Lin Feng || Zhengzhou, China || Decision (Unanimous) || 3 || 3:00
|-  style="background:#cfc;"
| 2012-05-04 || Win ||align=left| Deng Zeqi || Wu Lin Feng || Zhengzhou, China || Decision (Unanimous) || 3 || 3:00
|-  style="background:#cfc;"
| 2012-04-13 || Win ||align=left| Masato Shirai || Wu Lin Feng: China vs Japan || Zhengzhou, China || ||  ||
|-  style="background:#fbb;"
| 2012-01-14 || Loss||align=left| Mike || Wu Lin Feng || Zhengzhou, China || Decision || 3 || 3:00
|-  style="background:#cfc;"
| 2011-12-11 || Win ||align=left| Tisahami || Wu Lin Feng China vs Thailand|| Kaifeng, China ||  ||  ||
|-  style="background:#cfc;"
| 2011-11-06 || Win ||align=left| Anhuang Rangrong || Wu Lin Feng || Bozhou, China ||  ||  ||
|-  style="background:#c5d2ea;"
| 2011-09-24 || Draw ||align=left| Eddie || Wu Lin Feng-Battle of Malaysia || Kuala Lumpur, Malaysia || Ex.R Decision || 4 || 3:00
|-  style="background:#cfc;"
| 2011-08-20 || Win ||align=left| Keita Yamaguchi || Wu Lin Feng || Zhengzhou, China || Decision (Unanimous) || 3 || 3:00
|-  style="background:#cfc;"
| 2011-07-30 || Win ||align=left| Ynag Hefu || Wu Lin Feng || Dengfeng, China || Decision (Unanimous) || 3 || 3:00
|-  style="background:#cfc;"
| 2011-07-16 || Win ||align=left| Liu Xiangming || Wu Lin Feng || Zhengzhou, China || Decision (Unanimous) || 3 || 3:00
|-  style="background:#cfc;"
| 2011-06-18 || Win ||align=left| Lin Shuai || Wu Lin Feng || Zhengzhou, China || Decision (Unanimous) || 3 || 3:00
|-  style="background:#fbb;"
| 2011-04-02 || Loss ||align=left| Tie Yinghua || Wu Lin Feng || Zhengzhou, China || Decision || 3 || 3:00
|-  style="background:#cfc;"
| 2011-03-19 || Win ||align=left| Yang Haibo || Wu Lin Feng || Zhengzhou, China || Decision (Unanimous) || 3 || 3:00
|-  style="background:#cfc;"
| 2011-02-26 || Win ||align=left| Lin Shuai || Wu Lin Feng || Zhengzhou, China || KO (High Kick) || 3 || 0:08
|-  style="background:#fbb;"
| 2011-01-01 || Loss ||align=left| Hong Guang || Wu Lin Feng || Zhengzhou, China || Decision || 3 || 3:00
|-
| colspan=9 | Legend:

Amateur Muay Thai record

|-	
|-  style="background:#fbb;"
| 2012-06-22 || Loss ||align=left| Qiu Jianliang || National Muaythai Competition 2012 & World Kungfu GF League Tryout, Quarter Finals -71 kg || Jingmen, China || Decision (Unanimous) || 4 || 2:00 	
|- 
|-
| colspan=9 | Legend:

References 

1992 births
Living people
Chinese male kickboxers
Chinese sanshou practitioners
Chinese wushu practitioners
People from Fuyang
Sportspeople from Anhui